In the Battle of Giornico (28 December 1478) a Swiss force of 600 defeated 10,000 Milanese troops.

History
The Battle of Giornico was part of an expansionist policy of the Old Swiss Confederation during the 15th century. The confederation attempted to expand into the southern foothills of the Alps to gain control of both ends of the valuable mountain passes. In November 1478, Uri troops moved south over the Gotthard pass into the Leventina valley. The population of the valley, who had long been opposed to Milan, greeted the Swiss troops as liberators and allies. However, below the valley at Bellinzona, they found the city gates closed. Uri was quickly joined by forces from other Confederation cantons and established a siege camp below the walls of Bellinzona on 30 November 1478. The Duke of Milan responded by sending 10,000 men toward Bellinzona to drive the Confederates back and reassert his control over the Leventina.

The battle
However, the Confederates had already retired, after a 14-day siege of Bellinzona, to the Gotthard Pass. Only a 175-strong reserve army, reinforced by about 400 soldiers from the Leventina, were guarding the rear at Giornico in the Leventina valley. The entire Milanese army reached Giornico on 28 December 1478 and outnumbered the defenders by about twenty-to-one. The defenders were able to defeat the much larger force because the Milanese army was confined in a narrow valley, struggling for foothold on the December snow and ice. The Swiss ambushed the army from above, creating confusion by rolling large boulders down the hillside. They reportedly also wore crampons for better foothold. Against this attack, the Milanese army was helpless regardless of its superior number, and they were forced to flee, leaving an estimated 1,400 dead.

Aftermath
Following this decisive defeat, the Duke of Milan withdrew from the Leventina, leaving it under Uri's control. The treaty of Lucerne was signed on 3 March 1480 establishing the cession of Leventina from Milan to Uri.

To consolidate his power in Bellinzona, the Duke of Milan built the small Sasso Corbaro castle. Nine years later, the Swiss and the Milanese met again, in 1487, at the Battle of Crevola.

See also
 Battles of the Old Swiss Confederacy

References

1478 in Europe
1470s in the Holy Roman Empire
15th century in Italy
Giornico 1478
Giornico 1478
Battles of the Middle Ages
Conflicts in 1478
15th century in the Old Swiss Confederacy